The Intercontinental Church of God (ICG) is a nontrinitarian Christian denomination currently headquartered in Tyler, Texas, United States, which was founded by Garner Ted Armstrong (1930–2003) in 1998.

ICG produces a television program and has congregations in the United States, Canada and Australia.

Beliefs
The Intercontinental Church of God is a splinter group of the U.S. based Church of God International. As such it holds to most of the distinctive beliefs taught by the Church of God International (United States) such as the continuing validity of the Law of Moses (e.g., observing Saturday as the seventh day sabbath and observing the biblical holy days) by Christians, and the falsity of the Trinity, personality of the Holy Spirit, and immortality of the soul. A veracity interpretation of biblical prophecy is strongly emphasized, particularly through their sister ministry, the Garner Ted Armstrong Evangelistic Association.

See also
 Herbert W. Armstrong
 Church of God, International
 The World Tomorrow (radio and television)

References

Bibliography
 "Garner Ted Armstrong and CGI Parting", The Journal – News of the Churches of God, Issue No. 12 (January 30, 1998)
 "Garner Ted Armstrong", National Obituary Archive
 "1998", The Journal – News of the Churches of God, Timeline 1998

External links 
 Intercontinental Church of God website
 Garner Ted Armstrong Evangelistic Association website

Church of God (Armstrong)
Church of God denominations
Christian denominations established in the 20th century
Nontrinitarian denominations
Christian organizations established in 1998
Seventh-day denominations